The Kalidas Samman is an arts award presented annually by the Government of Madhya Pradesh in India. The award is named after Kālidāsa, a renowned Classical Sanskrit writer of ancient India. The Kalidas Samman was first awarded in 1980. It was initially conferred in alternate years in four fields: Classical Music, Classical Dance, Theatre and Plastic Arts. From 1986-87 to 2008-09, the awards were presented in all four fields in most years, thereafter reverting to one person per year.

Recipients
The recipients of the Kalidas Samman:

References

External links
  
  
  
  

Dance awards
Indian music awards
Indian art awards
Government of Madhya Pradesh
Indian theatre awards
Kalidasa
1980 establishments in Madhya Pradesh
Awards established in 1980
Recipients of Kalidas Samman